

The National College is a high school located at 4 Arcu Street, Iași, Romania.

History

The school traces its origins to two earlier institutions, the Vasilian College and Academia Mihăileană. In 1860, when the latter's higher education role was taken over by the new University of Iași, it continued as the National College, a high school with seven grades. In 1864, it was renamed the National High School; reflecting its early commitment to the Romanian language, it was the country's first school to feature the term “national” in its name. The new and current building, designed by Nicolae Gabrielescu, dates to 1890–1894. The student magazine Spre lumină first appeared in 1903. In 1916–1918, during World War I, the building was used as a Red Cross hospital.

After the war, the students founded a radio station and, in 1923, a cinema. During the same period, the school had its own orchestra, a uniform and military training. A dormitory for rural students opened in 1922; some 30 boys lived there free of charge, but were required to wear traditional dress. A permanent dormitory building was inaugurated in 1926. A new school flag was adopted that year, replacing one from 1828. In March 1944, during the Uman–Botoșani offensive of World War II, students and faculty were evacuated to Făget in the Banat, returning one year later.

In 1948, after the onset of the communist regime, the school underwent various name changes, ultimately settling on Mihail Sadoveanu. In 1978, on the 150th anniversary of Romanian-language education in Western Moldavia, the National High School name was restored. The buildings were rehabilitated between 1993 and 2003; meanwhile, it was declared a national college in 1998.

The 1894 school building is listed as a historic monument by Romania's Ministry of Culture and Religious Affairs.

Faculty and alumni

Alumni

Alexandru Bădărău
George Bogdan
Octav Botez
Gheorghe I. Brătianu
Alexandru Cazaban
Vasile Conta
Ovid Densusianu
Emil Fagure
Benjamin Fondane
Calistrat Hogaș
Victor Iamandi
Nicolae Iorga
Nicolae Labiș
Petre Liciu
Gheorghe Macovei
Petru Th. Missir
Ilie Moscovici
George Panu
Dimitrie D. Pătrășcanu
Grigore T. Popa
Mihail Sadoveanu
Gheorghe Spacu
Corneliu Șumuleanu
Ionel Teodoreanu
Constantin C. Teodorescu

Faculty
Petre Andrei
Traian Bratu
Vasile Burlă
Alexandru Lambrior
Titu Maiorescu
Alexandru Piru
Heimann Hariton Tiktin

Notes

External links

 Official site

High schools in Iași
Educational institutions established in 1860
1860 establishments in Romania
School buildings completed in 1894
National Colleges in Romania
Historic monuments in Iași County